Meikit, ketjut ja vyöt (Make-up, Necklaces and Belts) is the second studio album by Finnish pop rock singer-songwriter Maija Vilkkumaa. Released by Warner Music in Finland physically on 9 April 2001, and digitally on 16 June 2008, the album debuted at number one on the Finnish Albums Chart, maintaining the peak three weeks and spending 26 weeks on the chart. Meikit, ketjut ja vyöt has sold over 36,000 copies to date in Finland, which has granted it a platinum certification.

Singles
The (rough) English translations of the tracks are in the brackets.
"Noinko vaikeeta se on?" ("Is It That Hard?", promotional)
"Ingalsin Laura" ("Laura Ingals  [Wilder]")
"Totuutta ja tehtävää" ("Truth and Dare")
"Prinsessa Jää" ("Princess Ice")

Track listing
Digital download

Charts and certifications

Weekly charts

Year-end charts

|-

|-

|-

Certifications

References

2001 albums
Maija Vilkkumaa albums
Finnish-language albums